The Štip-Kočani (Štipsko - Kočanski dijalekt) is a dialect of Macedonian. It is a member of the  eastern group of the Macedonian dialects. This dialect is spoken in the central eastern part of Macedonia, respectively in Štip, Probištip, Kočani, Vinica, Radoviš and in the surrounding areas.

Characteristics
 Use of the preposition у (во град > у градо)
 Use of the word "speak" the word "tomatoes" use of the word "stairs"Personal Pronouns

SingularЈа (I)Ти (You)Он (He)Она (She)Оноа (Оно) (It)

PluralНие (We)Вие (You)Они (Тиа)'' (They)

Notes

Dialects of the Macedonian language
Štip Municipality
Probištip Municipality
Kočani Municipality
Vinica Municipality, Macedonia
Radoviš Municipality